The Music City Grand Prix, known as the Big Machine Music City Grand Prix for sponsorship reasons, is an IndyCar Series race held at the Nashville Street Circuit in Nashville, Tennessee. Marcus Ericsson won the inaugural event in 2021.

History

Background 

On September 16, 2020, the IndyCar Series announced the addition of the Music City Grand Prix as a street circuit race in downtown Nashville for its 2021 schedule. This announcement came after three years of discussion between Nashville sports and tourism officials and IndyCar executives, which had previously resulted in three failed proposals for a race in Nashville. Two of the three failed attempts, which occurred in 2010 and 2015, respectively, were led by former Pocono Raceway president Joseph Mattioli III. The Music City Grand Prix is privately funded and has a three-year contract for IndyCar Series races. Nashville's successful hosting of the 2019 NFL Draft was one of the deciding factors in the race becoming a reality, according to Penske Entertainment Corporation President and CEO Mark Miles. The Tennessee Titans serve as a host for the race.

Two-time IndyCar Series champion and Nashville-area native Josef Newgarden called the race "the number-one destination outside of the Indy 500". He further opined that "it is going to showcase the town of Nashville probably the best way possible." Nashville mayor John Cooper called the race "a catalyst for our economic recovery".

The Music City Grand Prix became the first new street circuit race for the IndyCar Series since the Grand Prix of Houston in 2013. It also became Nashville's first IndyCar race since the Indy 200 was held at Nashville Superspeedway between 2001 and 2008. The Music City Grand Prix was scheduled as the sixth street circuit race of the 2021 season, joining the doubleheader at Detroit along with races at Long Beach, St. Petersburg, and Toronto. All of these races have been run since at least 2012, however, and more recent events on street circuits have already become defunct, including races in Baltimore, Boston (which was never held), and Houston.

Circuit design 

The Nashville Street Circuit measures  and includes 11 turns. Running adjacent to Nissan Stadium, the circuit's most notable feature is its  straightaway across the Korean War Veterans Memorial Bridge, which spans the Cumberland River. The bridge layout makes the track the only one on the IndyCar circuit and one of the few in the world to cross a significant body of water. As at Mid-Ohio Sports Car Course, the Nashville Street Circuit uses a different location for starting the race (between turns 3 and 4) than the finish line. Middle Tennessee State University's School of Concrete and Construction Management created concrete mixes for the track's barriers and pit row. Music City Grand Prix CEO Matt Crews noted that the event organizers planned to "limit traffic interruptions as much as possible". Track designer Tony Cotman intentionally avoided Nashville's major streets so as not to adversely affect tourism. Discussing the design of the circuit, he called the Korean War Veterans Memorial Bridge "one of those landmarks where you see that bridge on TV or in photos and you’re going to know exactly where it is. It’s like seeing the Queen Mary in the background at Long Beach." Cotman also noted that he expects turns 1, 2, and 7 to be the best passing locations on the circuit.

Pundits and drivers, including former Formula One drivers Romain Grosjean and Marcus Ericsson, have compared the Nashville Street Circuit to the Baku City Circuit that hosts the Azerbaijan Grand Prix. The Nashville Street Circuit's downtown section and long straightaways on the Korean War Veterans Memorial Bridge have been compared to the castle section and long straights at Baku.

Race summaries 
2021: The inaugural Music City Grand Prix was held at 5:30 pm EDT on August 8, 2021. During the August 6–8 race weekend, the GT America series, the Trans-Am Series TA2 class, and the Stadium Super Trucks also competed as support series. Marcus Ericsson took victory in the inaugural event despite being involved in an early incident in which his car became airborne after running over the car of Sebastian Bourdais. Polesitter Colton Herta lead the most laps, but crashed while attempting to retake the lead from Ericsson. Scott Dixon and James Hinchcliffe completed the podium. The race was incident-filled, with nine caution periods resulting in a total of 33 of the event's 80 laps run under caution conditions and two race stoppages.
2022: Scott McLaughlin qualified on pole. The race was delayed by an hour and a half due to thunderstorms, though the track was dried before the start of the race. McLaughlin held the lead through the early stint of the race before a large caution period saw Scott Dixon cycle to the front around lap 54 by virtue of being the first one to make his last pitstop. Dixon would hold the lead for the remainder of the race despite his car suffering floor damage earlier in the race that took away significant downforce. McLaughlin made a late charge to a near photo finish with Dixon by virtue of conserving his push to pass but ultimately settled for second place. Alex Palou rounded out the podium. Much like the inaugural Music City GP the race was incident filled, with eight total caution periods during the race.

Race results

NTT IndyCar Series

Support events

GT America Series

Trans-Am Series TA2

Stadium Super Trucks

Indy Lights

Lap Records

The official race lap records at the Nashville Street Circuit are listed as:

References

External links
 

Music City Grand Prix
Recurring sporting events established in 2021
2021 establishments in Tennessee
IndyCar Series races